Anshan is a town in Changli County, in the northeast of Hebei province, China, located  west of the county seat. , the town has 39 villages under its administration.

See also
List of township-level divisions of Hebei

References

Township-level divisions of Hebei
Qinhuangdao